Quaine Bartley (born 28 October 2003) is an English professional footballer who plays as a forward for  club AFC Wimbledon. He has played on loan at Cray Wanderers and Potters Bar Town.

Career
Bartley joined the Academy at AFC Wimbledon from Tottenham Hotspur at under-13 level. He joined Isthmian League Premier Division club Cray Wanderers on a 28-day loan on 25 September 2021. Loans manager Michael Hamilton said that "we always prioritise a player’s development over results for our academy team". On 5 February 2022, he joined Potters Bar Town on loan. He scored over twenty goals to help the AFC Wimbledon academy to secure its first ever Youth Alliance League title in the 2021–22 season and signed his first professional contract in August 2022.

He made his senior debut for the club on 9 August 2022, coming on as an 89th-minute substitute for George Marsh in a 2–0 defeat to Gillingham in an EFL Cup match at Plough Lane. He made his EFL League Two debut in a 1–0 defeat at Barrow on 27 August, and said after the game that "all you want to do is come on and make an impact".

Style of play
AFC Wimbledon Academy manager Michael Hamilton described Bartley as a powerful centre-forward with very good technical skills.

Career statistics

References

2003 births
Living people
English footballers
Association football forwards
Tottenham Hotspur F.C. players
AFC Wimbledon players
Cray Wanderers F.C. players
Potters Bar Town F.C. players
Isthmian League players
English Football League players
Black British sportspeople
English people of Jamaican descent